Astronomia nova (English: New Astronomy, full title in original Latin) is a book, published in 1609, that contains the results of the astronomer Johannes Kepler's ten-year-long investigation of the motion of Mars.

One of the most significant books in the history of astronomy, the Astronomia nova provided strong arguments for heliocentrism and contributed valuable insight into the movement of the planets. This included the first mention of the planets' elliptical paths and the change of their movement to the movement of free floating bodies as opposed to objects on rotating spheres. It is recognized as one of the most important works of the Scientific Revolution.

Background
Prior to Kepler, Nicolaus Copernicus proposed in 1543 that the Earth and other planets orbit the Sun. The Copernican model of the Solar System was regarded as a device to explain the observed positions of the planets rather than a physical description.

Kepler sought for and proposed physical causes for planetary motion. His work is primarily based on the research of his mentor, Tycho Brahe. The two, though close in their work, had a tumultuous relationship. Regardless, in 1601 on his deathbed, Brahe asked Kepler to make sure that he did not "die in vain," and to continue the development of his model of the Solar System. Kepler would instead write the Astronomia nova, in which he rejects the Tychonic system, as well as the Ptolemaic system and the Copernican system. Some scholars have speculated that Kepler's dislike for Brahe may have had a hand in his rejection of the Tychonic system and formation of a new one.

By 1602, Kepler set to work on determining the orbit pattern of Mars, keeping David Fabricius informed of his progress. He suggested the possibility of an oval orbit to Fabricius by early 1604, though was not believed. Later in the year, Kepler wrote back with his discovery of Mars's elliptical orbit. The manuscript for Astronomia nova was completed by September 1607, and was in print by August 1609.

Structure and summary

In English, the full title of his work is the New Astronomy, Based upon Causes, or Celestial Physics, Treated by Means of Commentaries on the Motions of the Star Mars, from the Observations of Tycho Brahe, Gent. For over 650 pages, Kepler walks his readers, step by step, through his process of discovery.

The discussion of scripture in the Astronomia novas introduction was the most widely distributed of Kepler's works in the seventeenth century. The introduction outlines the four steps Kepler took during his research.

The first step is his claim that the Sun itself and not any imaginary point near the Sun (as in the Copernican system) is the point where all the planes of the eccentrics of the planets intersect, or the center of the orbits of the planets. 
The second step consists of Kepler placing the Sun as the center and mover of the other planets. This step also contains Kepler's reply to objections against placing the Sun at the center of the universe, including objections based on scripture. In reply to scripture, he argues that it is not meant to claim physical dogma, and the content should be taken spiritually. 
In the third step, he posits that the Sun is the source of the motion of all planets, using Brahe’s proof based on comets that planets do not rotate on orbs. 
The fourth step consists of describing the path of planets as not a circle, but an oval.

As the Astronomia nova proper starts, Kepler demonstrates that the Tychonic, Ptolemaic, and Copernican systems are indistinguishable on the basis of observations alone.  The three models predict the same positions for the planets in the near term, although they diverge from historical observations, and fail in their ability to predict future planetary positions by a small, though absolutely measurable amount. Kepler here introduces his famous diagram of the movement of Mars in relation to Earth if Earth remained unmoving at the center of its orbit. The diagram shows that Mars's orbit would be completely imperfect and never follow along the same path.

Kepler discusses all his work at great length throughout the book. He addresses this length in the sixteenth chapter:
If thou art bored with this wearisome method of calculation, take pity on me, who had to go through with at least seventy repetitions of it, at a very great loss of time.

Kepler, in a very important step, also questions the assumption that the planets move around the center of their orbit at a uniform rate.  He finds that computing critical measurements based upon the Sun's actual position in the sky, instead of the Sun's "mean" position injects a significant degree of uncertainty into the models, opening the path for further investigations. The idea that the planets do not move at a uniform rate, but at a speed that varies as their distance from the Sun, was completely revolutionary and would become his second law (discovered before his first). Kepler, in his calculations leading to his second law, made multiple mathematical errors, which luckily cancelled each other out “as if by miracle.”

Given this second law, he puts forth in Chapter 33 that the Sun is the engine that moves the planets. To describe the motion of the planets, he claims the Sun emits a physical species, analogous to the light it also emits, which pushes the planets along. He also suggests a second force within every planet itself that pulls it towards the Sun to keep it from spiraling off into space.

Kepler then attempts to find the true shape of planetary orbits, which he determines is elliptical. His initial attempt to define the orbit of Mars as a circle was off by only eight minutes of arc, but this was enough for him to dedicate six years to resolve the discrepancy. The data seemed to produce a symmetrical oviform curve inside of his predicted circle. He first tested an egg shape, then engineered a theory of an orbit which oscillates in diameter, and returned to the egg. Finally, in early 1605, he geometrically tested an ellipse, which he had previously assumed to be too simple a solution for earlier astronomers to have overlooked. Ironically, he had already derived this solution trigonometrically many months earlier. As he says,
I laid [the original equation] aside, and fell back on ellipses, believing that this was quite a different hypothesis, whereas the two, as I shall prove in the next chapter, are one in  the same... Ah, what a foolish bird I have been!

Kepler's laws
The Astronomia nova records the discovery of the first two of the three principles known today as Kepler's laws of planetary motion, which are:
That the planets move in elliptical orbits with the Sun at one focus.
That the speed of the planet changes at each moment such that the time between two positions is always proportional to the area swept out on the orbit between these positions.

Kepler discovered the "second law" before the first.  He presented his second law in two different forms:  In Chapter 32 he states that the speed of the planet varies inversely based upon its distance from the Sun, and therefore he could measure changes in position of the planet by adding up all the distance measures, or looking at the area along an orbital arc.  This is his so-called "distance law".  In Chapter 59, he states that a radius from the Sun to a planet sweeps out equal areas in equal times. This is his so-called "area law".

However, Kepler's "area-time principle" did not facilitate easy calculation of planetary positions.  Kepler could divide up the orbit into an arbitrary number of parts, compute the planet's position for each one of these, and then refer all questions to a table, but he could not determine the position of the planet at each and every individual moment because the speed of the planet was always changing.  This paradox, referred to as the "Kepler problem," prompted the development of calculus.

A decade after the publication of the Astronomia nova, Kepler discovered his "third law", published in his 1619 Harmonices Mundi (Harmonies of the world). He found that the ratio of the cube of the length of the semi-major axis of each planet's orbit, to the square of time of its orbital period, is the same for all planets.

Kepler's knowledge of gravity

In his introductory discussion of a moving earth, Kepler addressed the question of how the Earth could hold its parts together if it moved away from the center of the universe which, according to Aristotelian physics, was the place toward which all heavy bodies naturally moved.  Kepler proposed an attractive force similar to magnetism, which may have been known by Newton.

Gravity is a mutual corporeal disposition among kindred bodies to unite or join together; thus the earth attracts a stone much more than the stone seeks the earth. (The magnetic faculty is another example of this sort).... If two stones were set near one another in some place in the world outside the sphere of influence of a third kindred body, these stones, like two magnetic bodies, would come together in an intermediate place, each approaching the other by a space proportional to the bulk [moles] of the other....  For it follows that if the earth's power of attraction will be much more likely to extend to the moon and far beyond, and accordingly, that nothing that consists to any extent whatever of terrestrial material, carried up on high, ever escapes the grasp of this mighty power of attraction.

Kepler discusses the Moon's gravitational effect upon the tides as follows:
The sphere of the attractive virtue which is in the moon extends as far as the earth, and entices up the waters; but as the moon flies rapidly across the zenith, and the waters cannot follow so quickly, a flow of the ocean is occasioned in the torrid zone towards the westward. If the attractive virtue of the moon extends as far as the earth, it follows with greater reason that the attractive virtue of the earth extends as far as the moon and much farther; and, in short, nothing which consists of earthly substance anyhow constituted although thrown up to any height, can ever escape the powerful operation of this attractive virtue.

Kepler also clarifies the concept of lightness in terms of relative density, in opposition to the Aristotelian concept of the absolute nature or quality of lightness as follows. His argument could easily be applied today to something like the flight of a hot air balloon.

Nothing which consists of corporeal matter is absolutely light, but that is comparatively lighter which is rarer, either by its own nature, or by accidental heat. And it is not to be thought that light bodies are escaping to the surface of the universe while they are carried upwards, or that they are not attracted by the earth. They are attracted, but in a less degree, and so are driven outwards by the heavy bodies; which being done, they stop, and are kept by the earth in their own place.

In reference to Kepler's discussion relating to gravitation, Walter William Bryant makes the following statement in his book Kepler (1920).

...the Introduction to Kepler's "Commentaries on the Motion of Mars," always regarded as his most valuable work, must have been known to Newton, so that no such incident as the fall of an apple was required to provide a necessary and sufficient explanation of the genesis of his Theory of Universal Gravitation. Kepler's glimpse at such a theory could have been no more than a glimpse, for he went no further with it. This seems a pity, as it is far less fanciful than many of his ideas, though not free from the "virtues" and "animal faculties," that correspond to Gilbert's "spirits and humours". 

Kepler considered that this attraction was mutual and was proportional to the bulk of the bodies, but he considered it to have a limited range and he did not consider whether or how this force may have varied with distance.  Furthermore, this attraction only acted between "kindred bodies"—bodies of a similar nature, a nature which he did not clearly define.  Kepler's idea differed significantly from Newton's later concept of gravitation and it can be "better thought of as an episode in the struggle for heliocentrism than as a step toward Universal gravitation."

Kepler sent Galileo the book while the latter was working on his Dialogue Concerning the Two Chief World Systems (published in 1632, two years after Kepler's death). Galileo had been trying to determine the path of an object falling from rest towards the center of the Earth, but used a semicircular orbit in his calculation.

Commemoration 
The 2009 International Year of Astronomy commemorates the 400th anniversary of the publication of this work.

Notes

References 

 Johannes Kepler, New Astronomy, translated by William H. Donahue, Cambridge: Cambridge Univ. Pr., 1992.  
 Kepler's Astronomia Nova
 cosmology & astronomy

External links 
Astronomia nova by Johannes Kepler, 1609, in Latin, full text scan
Astronomia nova by Johannes Kepler, 1609, in Latin, full text at archive.org
Origins of Modernity - Kepler: Astronomia nova

1609 books
Astronomy books
17th-century Latin books
Physics books
Historical physics publications
History of astronomy
1609 in science
Works by Johannes Kepler